L. Luis Lopez is an American poet.

Life
Lopez graduated from  Spring Hill College, from St. John's College in Santa Fe, New Mexico with an MA, and from the University of New Mexico with a PhD.

He taught high school in Tampa, Florida, in Albuquerque, New Mexico, and in Grand Junction, Colorado.  At the university level, he taught in the Academic Honors Program at the University of New Mexico and at Mesa State College.

lopez lives in Grand Junction, Colorado.

Awards
 two NEH fellowships, one to study lyric poetry with Dr. Helen Vendler at Harvard, Summer 1983, and a second to study the literature of innocent suffering with Dr. Terrence Tilley (Duke University) at St. Michael's College.
2008 American Book Award

Works
 
 
 

Anthologies
 Once Upon a Place (Night Owl Books, 2008)
 Charity (Red Rock Press, 2002)
 
 Talking From the Heart (Men's Network Press, 1990)

References

External links
"Author's website"
"Renaissance Man In Ghost Ranch", Red Ravine, July 10, 2007

American male poets
Spring Hill College alumni
St. John's College (Annapolis/Santa Fe) alumni
University of New Mexico alumni
University of New Mexico faculty
1938 births
Living people
American Book Award winners